Southern Cayuga Central School District is a school district which spans the southern portion of Cayuga County in New York, United States. The superintendent is Patrick Jensen. The district operates two schools: Southern Cayuga Junior and Senior High School
and Emily Howland Elementary School.

Administration 
The district offices are located at 2384 State Route 34B.

Current administrators 
Mr. Patrick Jensen; Superintendent

Traditions and Events

Selected Former Superintendents 
Mr. David C. Smith
Mr. Peter F. Cardamone–?-2005
Mr. Thomas M. Turck–2005-2005
Ms. Mary Kay Worth–2006-2012

Southern Cayuga High School 

Southern Cayuga High School is located at 2384 Rt 34B, in Poplar Ridge and serves grades 9 through 12. The current principal is Mr. Luke Carnicelli.

History

Selected former principals 
Previous assignment and reason for departure denoted in parentheses
Ms. Mimi Trudeau ?-2002
Mr. James De Rusha–2002-2003
Mr. Dennis Farnsworth–2003-2005
Mrs. Karen Simon–2005-2006(Principal - Southern Cayuga Middle School, named Assistant Principal of North Street Elementary School)

Southern Cayuga Middle School 

Southern Cayuga Middle School is located at 2384 Rt 34B in Poplar Ridge and serves grades 5 through 8. The current principal is Mr. Christopher Clapper.

History

Former principals 
Previous assignment and reason for departure denoted in parentheses
Ms. Piri Taborosi
Ms. Siobhan O'Hora ?-2003
Mrs. Karen C. Simon–2003-2005 (Alternative school teacher - Geneva Middle School, named Principal of Southern Cayuga High School)

Emily Howland Elementary School 

Emily Howland Elementary School is located at 2892 State Route 34B in Aurora and serves grades K through 4. The current principal is Mrs. Mary Lou Cronin.

History

Selected former principals
Ms. Marian Andrews ?-2002

References

External links
Official site

School districts in New York (state)
Education in Cayuga County, New York